Saint-Sébastien–Froissart is a station on line 8 of the Paris Métro, named after the nearby streets of Rue de Saint-Sébastien and the Rue Froissart.

The station opened on 5 May 1931 with the extension of the line from Richelieu–Drouot to Porte de Charenton. The Rue de Saint-Sébastien was named after Saint Sebastian.  The Rue Froissart was named after the poet and writer Jean Froissart (ca 1337–1400).

Station layout

References

Roland, Gérard (2003). Stations de métro. D’Abbesses à Wagram. Éditions Bonneton.

Paris Métro stations in the 3rd arrondissement of Paris
Paris Métro stations in the 11th arrondissement of Paris
Railway stations in France opened in 1931